Calophasidia dentifera is a moth in the family Noctuidae. It is endemic to Western Australia.

External links
Australian Moths Online
Australian Faunal Directory

Hadeninae